The Department of External Territories was an Australian government department that existed between June 1941 and May 1951.

Scope
Information about the department's functions and/or government funding allocation could be found in the Administrative Arrangements Orders, the annual Portfolio Budget Statements and in the Department's annual reports.

The matters dealt with by the department at its creation were:
the administration of the Territories of Nauru, New Guinea, Norfolk Island and Papua;
Shipping services to certain Pacific Islands and the Territory of Papua and New Guinea; and 
the transfer of prisoners from Territories outside the Commonwealth.

Structure
The Department was a Commonwealth Public Service department, staffed by officials who were responsible to the Minister for External Territories.

References

Australia, External Territories
External Territories
1941 establishments in Australia
1951 disestablishments in Australia